Miss America 1985, the 58th Miss America pageant, was broadcast from the Boardwalk Hall in Atlantic City, New Jersey, on September 15, 1984 on NBC Network.

The winner, Paraguay native Sharlene Wells, became the first foreign-born Miss America. She later became a horse-racing and football commentator for ESPN.

Another of the five finalists, Lauren Green, is currently a correspondent on the Fox News Channel.

Results

Order of announcements

Top 10

Awards

Preliminary awards

Non-finalist awards

Judges
 Pearl Bailey
 LeRoy Neiman
 Rebecca Ann King
 Vivian Blaine
 Christopher Little
 Dixie Ross Neill
 Josiah Bunting III
 Sam Haskell

Contestants

External links
 Miss America official website

1985
1984 in the United States
1985 beauty pageants
1984 in New Jersey
September 1984 events in the United States
Events in Atlantic City, New Jersey